Josef Müller or Joseph Muller may refer to:

Josef Müller (CSU politician) (1898–1979), German politician and member of the German Resistance
Josef Müller (entomologist) (1880–1964), Croatian entomologist
Josef Müller (footballer) (1893–1984), German footballer
Josef Müller-Brockmann (1914–1996), graphic designer
Josef Felix Müller (born 1955), Swiss sculptor, graphic artist and painter
Joseph Muller (collector) (1883–1939), specialist in American music
Joseph Müller (priest) (1894–1944), German Catholic priest and critic of the Nazi regime
Joseph Muller (cyclist) (1895–1975), French cyclist
Joseph E. Muller (1908–1945), American soldier and Medal of Honor recipient
Joseph Maximilian Mueller (1894–1981), American prelate of the Roman Catholic Church
Josef Müller (art collector) (1887–1977), Swiss art collector and curator